In Greek mythology, Olenus (Ancient Greek: Ὤλενος Olenos) was the name of several individuals:

Olenus, son of Hephaestus and father of Helike and Aex, two nurses of infant Zeus. A city in Aulis was named for him.
Olenus, son of Zeus and Anaxithea (or Hippodamia), daughter of Danaus. He was the eponymous ruler of the city Olenus in Achaea. Olenus was succeeded by Crinacus (Crineus), another bastard son of Zeus.
Olenus, father of Tectaphus, a Lapith.
Olenus, a man who lived on Mount Ida. His wife Lethaea claimed she was more beautiful than any goddess. They were both turned to stone; although Olenus could have avoided this fate, he chose to be with his wife.
Olenus, a Lelegian, father of Phoceus. His son was killed by the Argonauts.

Notes

References 

 Gaius Julius Hyginus, Astronomica from The Myths of Hyginus translated and edited by Mary Grant. University of Kansas Publications in Humanistic Studies. Online version at the Topos Text Project.
 Gaius Valerius Flaccus, Argonautica translated by Mozley, J H. Loeb Classical Library Volume 286. Cambridge, MA, Harvard University Press; London, William Heinemann Ltd. 1928. Online version at theoi.com.
 Gaius Valerius Flaccus, Argonauticon. Otto Kramer. Leipzig. Teubner. 1913. Latin text available at the Perseus Digital Library.
 Pseudo-Clement, Recognitions from Ante-Nicene Library Volume 8, translated by Smith, Rev. Thomas. T. & T. Clark, Edinburgh. 1867. Online version at theoi.com
 Publius Ovidius Naso, Metamorphoses translated by Brookes More (1859-1942). Boston, Cornhill Publishing Co. 1922. Online version at the Perseus Digital Library.
 Publius Ovidius Naso, Metamorphoses. Hugo Magnus. Gotha (Germany). Friedr. Andr. Perthes. 1892. Latin text available at the Perseus Digital Library.
 Stephanus of Byzantium, Stephani Byzantii Ethnicorum quae supersunt, edited by August Meineike (1790-1870), published 1849. A few entries from this important ancient handbook of place names have been translated by Brady Kiesling. Online version at the Topos Text Project.

Kings in Greek mythology
Children of Zeus
Children of Hephaestus
Demigods in classical mythology
Metamorphoses characters
Metamorphoses into inanimate objects in Greek mythology